Dwale may refer to:
 Dwale, Kentucky, a census-designated place
Dwale (anaesthetic), an anaesthetic potion used in medieval medicine
 Atropa belladonna, a poisonous plant